Almar Latour is a media executive and current CEO of Dow Jones and Company.

Early life and education 
Latour grew up in the small Dutch town of Welten. During his childhood education he studied German, English, Dutch, and French. Through the Fulbright Program, Latour came to the United States in 1990 to study at the Indiana University of Pennsylvania. He graduated with Bachelor of Arts degrees in journalism and political science. He also earned a master's degree from American University.

Career 
Latour began his career working at student newspaper The Penn as a feature editor, as a reporter for a newspaper at New York State's Chautauqua resort and interning at a Dutch newspaper, The Washington Times and at The Wall Street Journal where his story appeared on the front page of the European edition.

In 1995, Latour was hired as a news assistant in the Washington bureau of The Wall Street Journal. Latour spent time in the London bureau and then moved to the New York office where he joined, and later led, the Journal technology team. Latour helped lead the transformation and redesign of the Journal's online presence, reaching 1 million digital subscribers.

In 2012, Latour became the executive editor of the Journal, Dow Jones, and MarketWatch.

In 2016, Latour was appointed editor and publisher of the newly formed Dow Jones Media Group, later renamed as Barron's Group. As publisher he set ambitious goals for each brand. Between 2016 and 2019, Barron's grew its subscriber base by 125% to 299,000 subscribers.

Dow Jones CEO 
On May 4, 2020, Dow Jones announced Latour would replace William Lewis as CEO. He assumed the role on May 15, 2020.

On July 21, 2020, more than 280 Journal journalists and Dow Jones staff members wrote a letter to Latour criticizing the opinion pages' "lack of fact-checking and transparency, and its apparent disregard for evidence," adding, "opinion articles often make assertions that are contradicted by WSJ reporting." The letter cited examples including a June 2020 opinion piece by vice president Mike Pence that contained errors, asserting that "scrutinizing these numbers would have required no more than a Google search."

He is reported to have a strained relationship with Matt Murray, editor in chief of The Wall Street Journal, a Dow Jones publication.

Personal life 
Latour met his wife Abby, a journalist, in Stockholm. They live in New York along with their two daughters, one of whom is Maude Latour, a singer-songwriter.

References 

Living people
The Wall Street Journal people
News Corporation people
Indiana University of Pennsylvania alumni
American University alumni
Year of birth missing (living people)